This is the complete list of Asian Games medalists in baseball from 1994 to 2018.

Men

References

External links
 Medalists from previous Asian Games – Baseball

Baseball
medalists